The herring smelts or argentines are a family, Argentinidae, of marine smelts. They are similar in appearance to smelts (family Osmeridae) but have much smaller mouths.
 
They are found in oceans throughout the world.

They form large schools close to the sea floor, and feed on plankton, especially krill, amphipods, small cephalopods, chaetognaths, and ctenophores.

Several species are fished commercially and processed into fish meal.

References
 

 
Taxa named by Charles Lucien Bonaparte
Ray-finned fish families